Riot Act (with its variations) is a stock short title used for legislation in the jurisdictions of both the United Kingdom and Ireland relating to riot.

List
Acts of the Parliament of England
17 Ric 2 c 8 (The whole Chapter was repealed by section 10(2) of, and Part I of Schedule 3 to, the Criminal Law Act 1967, wherein the entry for this Act in the column headed "title or short title" is "(Riots)")
The Riot Act 1411 (13 Hen 4 c. 7)
The Riot Act 1414 (2 Hen 5 Stat. 1 c. 8)

Act of the Parliament of Great Britain
The Riot Act (1714 or 1715)

Acts of the Parliament of the United Kingdom
The Riotous Assemblies (Scotland) Act 1822
The Riot (Damages) Act 1886

Act of the Parliament of Ireland
The Riot Act 1787 (27 Geo 3 c. 15 (I.)) (Repealed for by section 16 of, and the Third Schedule to the Criminal Law Act, 1997)

See also
List of short titles
Statutes concerning forcible entries and riots confirmed

Lists of legislation by short title